Captain Morgan's Revenge is the debut album by the Scottish heavy metal band Alestorm, released in 2008 by Napalm Records.

Drums were recorded by Migo Wagner, a session drummer, because Ian Wilson could not travel to Germany for the recordings, although he did make minor contributions to the album by recording some additional percussion. "Heavy Metal Pirates" was re-recorded during the same sessions but left off the album and later released as a digital download and on the Leviathan EP.

Track listing

Personnel
 Christopher Bowes - vocals, keyboards, tin whistle
 Ian Wilson - percussion
 Dani Evans - bass
 Gavin Harper - guitars, backing vocals, jew's harp, tambourine, additional drums

Additional personnel and staff
 Lasse Lammert - vibraslap, tambourine, producer, mixing, mastering, engineering
 Brendan Casey - backing vocals, additional bass
 Migo Wagner - drums, backing vocals
 Chris Mummelthey - backing vocals
 Steve Brown - photography
 Ingo Römling - cover art

References

2008 debut albums
Alestorm albums
Napalm Records albums
Cultural depictions of Henry Morgan